Bangladesh and Indonesia established diplomatic relations in 1971. Indonesia is the world's largest Muslim country, whereas Bangladesh is the world's fourth largest Muslim country. They are partners in the United Nations and various multilateral organisations, particularly in international peacekeeping, the Developing 8 Countries, the Non-Aligned Movement, the World Trade Organization and the Organisation of Islamic Cooperation. Bangladesh has an embassy in Jakarta, whereas Indonesia has an embassy in Dhaka. Official diplomatic relations were established in 1972 after Indonesia became one of the first Muslim countries to recognise independent Bangladesh.

History

The contacts between the Bay of Bengal region with Indonesian archipelago has commenced since centuries ago. Indonesia and Bangladesh were connected to the maritime Silk Road of the Indian Ocean trade network, where goods travels and ideas exchanged. Since the early 4th-century, Indonesia has received Hindu, and subsequently Buddhist influences from South Asia. In 9th-century the Srivijaya empire established contacts through religious and education relations with Buddhist schools, monasteries and universities in ancient India and Bangladesh, such as Nalanda and Somapura. Maritime links existed between the medieval Bengal Sultanate and kingdoms in the Indonesian archipelago, particularly Sumatra which lies to the southeast of the Bay of Bengal.

After the separation of Bangladesh from Pakistan, Indonesia along with other non-Arab Muslim countries such as Malaysia, Turkey and Afghanistan immediately recognised Bangladesh sovereignty in 1971. Subsequently, Bangladesh soon after its independence in 1971 established diplomatic relations with Indonesia and the Embassy started functioning from May 1972.

Cooperations
Both nations welcomes initiatives in furthering the bilateral co-operation in various areas including trade and investment, agriculture, defence, education, food security, good governance, counter-terrorism, research and technology as well as disaster mitigation and management. Besides bilateral co-operation, both nations exchanged their views on the two countries' co-operation in regional and global fora. As the Muslim majority countries, both nations also exchange view and voiced their concern on addressing the Rohingya Muslim refugees issue in neighbouring Myanmar.

At the end of October, both Bangladesh and Indonesia saw strikes involving millions of low-wage workers demanding substantial increases in their minimum wages.  Semen Indonesia, the country's largest cement maker, is mulling over plans to expand its business to Bangladesh in efforts to capitalize on Bangladesh's rising consumer demand. Bangladesh, Indonesia and Iran were rated as the nations most at risk from extreme weather and geophysical events according to a 2010 study.
, Global risks advisory firm Maplecroft, had developed the Natural Disasters Risk Index (NDRI) to enable businesses and insurance companies to identify risks to international assets.

Trade
Indonesia has recently signed a deal with a Bangladesh pharmaceutical company to export its goods to their country where Bangladesh sees another potential market for its pharmaceutical products. Trade between the two countries amounted to US$1.53 billion in 2017.

Diplomacy

Ambassadors of Bangladesh to Indonesia
 Khurram Khan Panni (1972-1975)
 A. H. S. Ataul Karim (1976-1979)
 Shamsul Islam (1979-1982)
 Moinul Hossain Chowdhury (1982-1986)
 Manzur Murshed (1986-1991)
 A. K. M. Farooq (1991-1995)
 Abdul Momen Chowdhury (1995-1996)
 Zia-us-Shams Chowdhury (1997-1998)
 M Afsarul Qader (1998-2002)
 Nasim Ferdous (2002-2006)
 Salma Khan (2006-2008)
 Syed Fahim Munaim (2008)
 Golam Mohammad (2010-2013)
 Md. Nazmul Quaunine (2013-2016)
 Azmal Kabir (2016-2020)
 Air Vice Marshal Mohammad Mostafizur Rahman (2020-present)

References

External links
 Embassy of Bangladesh in Jakarta, Indonesia
 Embassy of Indonesia in Dhaka, Bangladesh
 The 69th Celebration of the Independence Day of Indonesia in Dhaka, Bangladesh

 
Indonesia
Bilateral relations of Indonesia